Katowice International Fair was an international trade fair in Katowice and one of the largest in Poland (the largest being the Poznań International Fair). A few dozen events were organized there each year, with the participation of some 4,500 companies.

Location
The Katowice International Fair grounds are located in the Silesian Central Park, next to the Silesian Planetarium, in the heart of the Upper Silesian Metropolitan Union. The fair features a few dozen exhibition halls, large open space area (about 24 ha), conference centers, its own hotel, etc.

History
The grounds were opened as The Center of Technical Progress in 1963. For years, the activities were mostly non-commercial in nature, for example large exhibitions presenting achievement of the Soviet Union space program, at which young people and local space enthusiasts could view and even enter various space capsules (or their real-size mock-ups) and obtain related technical information. After the 1989 transition to the market economy, they grounds took up a more commercial character.

Accident
In January 2006 the fair was the site of the Katowice Trade Hall roof collapse.

See also
 Expo Silesia -alternative sielsian trade fair center;

Culture in Katowice
Trade fairs in Poland
1963 establishments in Poland
Recurring events established in 1963
Tourist attractions in Silesian Voivodeship
Economy of Katowice
Convention centres in Poland
Polish Limited Liability Companies